Several vessels have been named Lynx for the lynx:

 was launched at Whitby in 1776. From 1777 to 1798 she traded with the Baltic. Between 1798 and 1811 Lynx engaged in whaling in Davis Strait. She then changed to trading with New Brunswick; in 1812 a French privateer captured her.
She was sold into commercial service in 1820 and nothing is known of her subsequent fate.
 is a square topsail schooner launched in 2001 and based in Nantucket, Massachusetts. She is an interpretation of the 1812 American letter of marque vessel of the same name (see above).

See also
  – one of ten vessels or shore establishments of the British Royal Navy
  – one of two vessel names of the US Navy
  – a United States Navy patrol vessel in commission from 1917 to 1919
  – The British captured her in 1807 and named her HMS Heureux. She was broken up in 1814.
  – scuttled in 1942 to avoid capture by the Germans

Ship names